Tomopleura nivea is a species of sea snail, a marine gastropod mollusk in the family Borsoniidae.

Description
The seashell ranges from 15 mm to 30 mm long.

Distribution
This snail lives in the water between South Africa and Mozambique, and off the coast of Japan

References

 Kilburn R.N. (1986). Turridae (Mollusca: Gastropoda) of southern Africa and Mozambique. Part 3. Subfamily Borsoniinae. Annals of the Natal Museum. 27: 633–720.
 Steyn, D.G. & Lussi, M. (1998) Marine Shells of South Africa. An Illustrated Collector's Guide to Beached Shells. Ekogilde Publishers, Hartebeespoort, South Africa, ii + 264 pp.

External links
 
 Jousseaume F. (1883). Description d'espèces et genres nouveaux de mollusques. Bulletin de la Société Zoologique de France. 8: 186-204, pl. 10

nivea
Gastropods described in 1851